Anders Poulsen (died 1692), was a Sami noaidi, who was the last victim of the many Vardø witch trials, which took place between 1621 and 1692. In Sámi form his name was Poala-Ánde.

Life 
He was born in Torne Lappmark in Sweden, married and lived in Varanger. He was active as a noaidi, and as such used a Sámi drum. 

The drum was taken from him by force on 7 December 1691 during the Christianization of the Sámi people, and he was put on trial for idolatry for being a follower of the Pagan Sami shamanism religion. The law used to persecute him was however formally the witchcraft law. Poulsen explained the drum's use during his trial in February 1692. 

The case was considered significant and the local authorities sent a request to Copenhagen about how to deal with it. Before a sentence could be reached, however, he was killed by a fellow prisoner who suffered from insanity.

Drum 
Poulsen's drum became part of the Danish royal collection after his death and eventually entered the collections of the National Museum of Denmark. It was on loan to the Sámi Museum in Karasjok, northern Norway from 1979 but it took “a 40-year struggle” for it to be officially handed back to the Sámi people in 2022, according to Jelena Porsanger, director of the museum, following an appeal by Norway’s Sámi president to Queen Margrethe of Denmark.

References

1692 deaths
Witch trials in Norway
Norwegian Sámi people
17th-century births
Persecution of Sámi people
Norwegian Sámi shamans
People in Sámi history
Pagan martyrs